is a 1975 Japanese film directed by Kuroki Kazuo.

Plot
Tateo (Jun Etô), a mother-dominated young man who realizes that he must leave the place he loves, finding it too closed and constricting. With great affection and insight, Kuroki characterizes the villagers who surround Tateo: his neurotic mother and philandering father, who lives across town with his mistress; his grandfather, who is obsessed with the idea that he fathered a child by a promiscuous young girl; a drunken friend, etc.

Cast
 Jun Eto
 Yoshio Harada
 Miki Sugimoto
 Hajime Hana
 Hiroshi Inuzuka
 Keiko Takeshita
 Jun Hamamura

Awards and nominations
Blue Ribbon Awards
 Won: Best Supporting Actor - Yoshio Harada

References

External links

1975 films
Films directed by Kazuo Kuroki
1970s Japanese films